Maria Kirilenko and Zheng Jie won in the final against Lisa Raymond and Rennae Stubbs, 6–4, 6–4.

Seeds

Draw

Draw

External links
 Doubles draw

Southern California Open
2010 WTA Tour